Young World: The Future is the debut studio album by rapper Lil' Zane. The album features his smash hit single "Callin' Me". The album debuted at number 165 on the Billboard 200 chart with 7,000 copies sold in its first week and then peaked its second week at number 25 with 40,000 sold that week. The album also peaked at number 4 on the Top R&B/Hip-Hop Albums.

Track listing

Samples
"Ride on 'Em" contains dialogue samples from the film Menace II Society.
"Ways of the World" contains a sample of "Shape of My Heart" by Sting and Dominic Miller.
"All About the Fun" contains an interpolation of "Computer Love" by Zapp.
"Beautiful Feelin" contains a sample of "Love is the Key" by Tuck & Patti.

Chart history

References

External links

Lil Zane albums
2000 debut albums
Priority Records albums
Albums produced by Akon